Aubrey Poolo (born 30 November 1976), is a South African actor. He is best known for the roles in the films Five Fingers for Marseilles, Life Above All and Madiba.

Personal life
He was born on 30 November 1976 in Attredgeville, township of Pretoria, South Africa to a family of politicians. He was raised by his grandmother with the help of elders of Pan Africanist Congress of Azania (PAC).

Career
At very young age, he joined with the television program Legae la bana. In 2010, he made the film debut with the film Life, Above All. The film was screened in the Un Certain Regard section of the 2010 Cannes Film Festival. It was also selected as the South African entry for the Best Foreign Language Film at the 83rd Academy Awards and then made the final shortlist announced in January 2011. With the success of the film, he was selected to the 2017 American television mini-series Madiba for a minor role.

In 2017, he played a lead role 'Unathi' in the South African Western thriller film Five Fingers for Marseilles directed by Michael Matthews. It was later screened in the Discovery section at the 2017 Toronto International Film Festival and received critical acclaim.

Filmography

References

External links
 

Living people
South African male film actors
1976 births
South African male television actors
People from Alexandra, Gauteng
21st-century South African male actors